Göçkün can refer to the following villages in Turkey:

 Göçkün, Amasra
 Göçkün, İnebolu